Swarna Manjari  is a 1962 Indian Telugu-language swashbuckler film, produced by P. Adinarayana Rao under Anjali Pictures, and directed by Vedantam Raghavayya. It stars N. T. Rama Rao an Anjali Devi, with music composed by P. Adinarayana Rao. The film was simultaneously made in Tamil as Mangaiyar Ullam Mangatha Selvam.

Plot 
The film begins in a kingdom, with the birthday celebrations of its Prince Chandra Bhanu when a dancer Swarna Manjari trained by her father Varma gives her performance and wins his heart. Here the chief minister Mahendra Shakti a malicious person also attracted to her. Mahendra Shakti deceits in two shades, one as Rajaguru and another as a wizard. Now, he intrigues to sacrifice Swarna Manjari to the goddess to become omnipotent. So, he kidnaps and tries to molest her, but she absconds. Meanwhile, Chandra Bhanu, with his friend Srimukha makes a tour before the coronation. On the way, he learns about the plight of Varma when he takes a vow to protect Swarna Manjari and make her his queen.

After stress, they land at a mysterious place where a Mermaid Yamini pulls him into the underwater world and tries to lure him but in vain. Parallelly, Srimukha is caught by a creeper Latha and they fall in love. Fortuitously, Swarna Manjari also winds up therein, cognizant of Chandrabhanu's condition, and moves to rescue him. Underwater with the blessing of Lord Jalakanteshwara Swamy retrieves Chandrabhanu. But, unfortunately, the mermaid decapitates her when Chandrabhanu beseech the mermaid which she accepts on an oath, that he should return by the full moon day. As per, Swarna Manjari becomes normal, but her hands are missing. Nevertheless, Chandrabhanu marries her.

Time Passes, the mermaid takes him back, and by that time, Swarna Manjari gives birth to a baby boy. At present, Rajuguru's ruse makes Swarna Manjari ostracize from the kingdom along with the baby and in the forest, both of them get separated. The baby reaches Varma and he recognizes him by the locket on his neck. On the other side, the Mermaid requests Chandra Bhanu to carry out an adventurous tour to remove her curse which he accomplishes. Thereafter, Chandra Bhanu is relieved and returns when he finds out the falsity of Rajaguru, but he is captured. Eventually, in search of her baby, Swarna Manjari saves a snake and with its boon, she gets her hands back. At last, Swarna Manjari, Srimukha, Latha, & Varma reach Rajaguru's den. Finally, Chandra Bhanu stamps out Mahendra Shakti, and the movie ends on a happy note.

Cast 
N. T. Rama Rao as Chandra Bhanu
Anjali Devi as Swarna Manjari
Rajanala as Mahendra Shakti
V. Nagayya as Varma
Ramakrishna as Lord Jalakanteshwara Swamy
Padmanabham as Srimukhudu
Peketi Sivaram as Danka
Allu Ramalingaiah as Damaru
Kannamba as Raja Maata Vasundhara Devi
Jayanthi as Yamini
Meena Kumari as Latha

Soundtrack 
Music composed by P. Adinarayana Rao. Lyrics were written by Samudrala Sr.

References

External links 

1960s fantasy adventure films
Indian fantasy adventure films
Films directed by Vedantam Raghavayya
Indian swashbuckler films
1960s Telugu-language films